†'Partula raiatensis was a species of air-breathing tropical land snail, a terrestrial pulmonate gastropod mollusk in the family Partulidae. This species was endemic to French Polynesia. It is now extinct.

References

Partula (gastropod)
Extinct gastropods
Taxonomy articles created by Polbot